A list of films produced in the United Kingdom in 1946:

See also
 1946 in British music
 1946 in British television
 1946 in the United Kingdom

References

External links
 

1946
1940s in British cinema
British
Film